"Claude Monet" is a song by Australian rapper Allday, released in December 2013. The single was certified gold in Australia in 2021.

About the song, Allday said "I guess it's about growing up and how things get out of control before you know it. Claude Monet was credited with inventing the Impressionist movement and his paintings look blurry up close, but make sense from a distance. So I thought that would be a fitting metaphor."

Music video
The music video was filmed in Adelaide, South Australia and produced by Simplex & Cam Bluff.

Track listing
Digital download
 "Claude Monet" – 3:53

Certifications

References

Allday songs
2013 songs
2013 singles
Songs written by Allday